Feliks Grzegorz Żuber (10 October 1905 – 21 June 1940) was a Polish sprinter. He competed in the men's 400 metres at the 1928 Summer Olympics. He was executed during World War II in the Palmiry massacre.

References

External links

1905 births
1940 deaths
Athletes from Warsaw
People from Warsaw Governorate
Athletes (track and field) at the 1928 Summer Olympics
Polish male sprinters
Olympic athletes of Poland
Polish people executed by Nazi Germany
Polish civilians killed in World War II